Mario Danailov (born 20 July 1988) is a Bulgarian footballer currently playing for Ludogorets Razgrad as a midfielder.

References

External links 
  Profile

Bulgarian footballers
1988 births
Living people
Second Professional Football League (Bulgaria) players
PFC Ludogorets Razgrad players
Place of birth missing (living people)
Association football midfielders